Mall of the World is a project to build the largest shopping center of its kind in the world, which envisions a fully air conditioned city, comprising more than . Mall of the World was originally announced in November 2012 and was planned to be the largest shopping mall in the world, to be located in Mohammed bin Rashid City, a mixed-use development in Dubai, United Arab Emirates. In August 2016, Dubai Holding announced Mall of the World would be relocated to Sheikh Mohammad bin Zayed Road. The original plan includes eight million square feet of shopping areas, the largest indoor game park in the world with a dome that can be opened during the winter time, and areas for theaters, cultural events, medical tourism, and about 20,000 hotel rooms. The mall is expected to be able to receive 180 million visitors annually.

See also

 List of shopping malls in Dubai
 List of the world's largest shopping malls
 Mall of Arabia (Dubai) – in Mohammed bin Rashid City
 Mall of the Emirates

References

External links
 
 Press release – from Dubai Holding on 5 July 2014 "Mohammed Bin Rashid launches Mall of the World".

 
 Dubai’s Dh25 billion Mall of the World development on the move again - The National 1 September 2016

Shopping malls in Dubai